Adolph Salomonsohn (19 March 1831 – 4 January 1919) was a German lawyer and banker. He was a proprietor of the Disconto-Gesellschaft and influenced the establishment of the stock market in Germany.

Biography
Salomonsohn was born in Inowrazlaw, Prussian Province of Posen (now Inowrocław, Poland) to Gedalia Salomonsen (1799–1837), a merchant born in Copenhagen, and Ernestine (née Levy, 1801–67), a native of Inowrazlaw. His grandfather, Salomon Abraham Gedalia (1776–1844), was a rabbi in Copenhagen.

Salomonson attended school in Bromberg (Bydgoszcz). After studying law he worked at the local court in Berlin. He rejected David Hansemann's offer to work for the Disconto-Gesellschaft in Berlin and instead started to practice as a lawyer and notary in Ratibor (Racibórz). After being publicly insulted by the Prussian minister of justice, Leopold zur Lippe-Biesterfeld-Weißenfeld, Salomonsohn closed his law office to return to Berlin and started to work for the Disconto-Gesellschaft in 1863. He was given procuration in 1866 and became proprietor in 1869.

In 1868 he married Sara Rinkel (1851–1929) from Landeshut, Silesia (Kamienna Góra); they had three daughters and one son, Georg (1869–1957), who also became a banker. His nephew was German banker Arthur Salomonsohn.

Next to Adolph von Hansemann Salomonsohn was influential in the nascent stock market activities in German banking. He was especially active in the funding of the Gotthard railway and remained a member of the administrative board of the Gotthard railway society until 1909. Salomonsohn was also a member of the administrative board of the Norddeutsche Bank, the "Union AG für Bergbau" (Dortmund), the potash works Aschersleben and the "Gelsenkirchener Bergwerks-AG", whose director Emil Kirdorf was a close friend.
 
Salomonsohn retired from the active management of the Disconto-Gesellschaft in 1888 but remained a member of the supervisory board until his death on 4 January 1919 in Berlin.

References

1831 births
1919 deaths
People from Inowrocław
German people of Danish descent
People from the Province of Posen
19th-century German Jews
German bankers